Bifidobacterium bifidum is a bacterial species of the genus Bifidobacterium.  B. bifidum is one of the most common probiotic bacteria that can be found in the body of mammals, including humans.

Structure and characteristics
B. bifidum is a Gram-positive, anaerobic bacterium that is neither motile nor spore-forming.  The bacterium is rod-shaped and can be found living in clusters, pairs, or even independently. The majority of the population of B. bifidum is found in the colon, lower small intestine, breast milk, and often in the vagina.

B. bifidum is an essential bacteria found in the human intestine. When it is low or absent all together in the human intestine, it is an indication of being in an unhealthy state. Intestinal flora can be improved if someone takes oral B. bifidum. Also, oral B. bifidum is used for other things such as therapy for enteric and hepatic disorders, for activating the immune response, and for preventing some cancers. 
B. bifidum decreases as people age. As B. bifidum decreases, other gut bacteria such as Lactobacilli, Enterococci, Enterobacteria and Clostridia increase. All of these increase an older adults risk for cancer and decrease the ability for their liver to function adequately and efficiently.
.

Benefits
The use of B. bifidum in probiotic applications may reduce the chances of acute diarrhea and the risk of E. coli infections, and contributes to the maintenance of vaginal homeostasis.

Intestinal microbial balance is important for an individual's digestive system. Some people keep this balance through diet alone where others take probiotics, which are microbial supplements. B. bifidum is an important intestinal microbe. One study shows that because hard cheese has a higher pH, higher fat content and is more solid, it is more effective in carrying probiotics such as B. bifidum to a person through ingestion.

Health concerns
The manipulation of the gut flora is complex and may cause bacteria-host interactions. Although probiotics, in general, are considered safe, there are concerns about their use in certain cases. Some people, such as those with compromised immune systems, short bowel syndrome, central venous catheters, heart valve disease and premature infants, may be at higher risk for adverse events. Rarely, consumption of probiotics may cause bacteremia, and sepsis, potentially fatal infections in children with lowered immune systems or who are already critically ill.

References

External links
Type strain of Bifidobacterium bifidum at BacDive -  the Bacterial Diversity Metadatabase

Bifidobacteriales
Probiotics
Bacteria described in 1900